Amie Kreppel is an American political scientist and a Jean Monnet Chair (ad personam), title awarded by the European Commission to top professors in the field of EU studies. She is currently Director of the Center for European Studies at the University of Florida, a federally funded  comprehensive Title VI National Resource Center (NRC) and a Jean Monnet Center of Excellence funded by the European Union. She was the President of the European Union Studies Association (EUSA) from 2011-2013 and served as co-editor (2014-2018) of the peer-reviewed Italian Political Science Review published by Cambridge University Press. In 2016 She was the Fulbright-Schuman Chair at the College of Europe.

Academic career
Kreppel received a BA and an MA from San Francisco State University, and a PhD in political science from the University of California, Los Angeles, under the supervision of George Tsebelis. Her first academic position was in 1998 as Assistant Professor at the University of Florida, where she is currently a Full Professor. She has also had a number of visiting positions at universities in Europe, such as Vrije Universiteit Brussel, Université Louis Pasteur, Université Libre de Bruxelles, the University of Exeter, and Libera Università Internazionale degli Studi Sociali Guido Carli in Rome.

Selected works
 The European Parliament and the Supranational Party System: A Study of Institutional Development. Cambridge University Press (Studies in Comparative Politics) 2002.

References

American women political scientists
American political scientists
European Union and European integration scholars
University of California, Los Angeles alumni
San Francisco State University alumni
University of Florida faculty
Living people
Year of birth missing (living people)
American women academics
21st-century American women